Satan's Wife (also known as Ring of Darkness and Un'ombra nell'ombra) is a 1979 Italian horror film directed by Pier Carpi.

Plot
The Prince of Darkness seduces four young women, spreading his seed so that his scourge may take human form.

References

External links

1970s Italian films
1979 films
Italian horror films
1970s Italian-language films
1979 horror films